Bernard F. "Beanie" Cooper (March 1, 1928 – April 20, 2014) was an American football coach and athletics administrator. He served as the head football coach at the University of South Dakota from 1975 to 1978, comping a record of 18–24–1. Cooper was also the athletic director at South Dakota from 1976 to 1981 and Indiana State University from 1981 to 1989.

As a high school football coach at Bishop Garrigan High School in Algona, Iowa and Bishop Heelan Catholic High School in Sioux City, Iowa, Cooper was inducted into the Iowa High School Football Hall of Fame.

Head coaching record

College

References

1928 births
2014 deaths
Indiana State Sycamores athletic directors
South Dakota Coyotes athletic directors
South Dakota Coyotes football coaches
High school football coaches in Iowa
Morningside University alumni
Sportspeople from Sioux City, Iowa